The 2012 British Academy Scotland New Talent Awards were held on 22 March 2012 at the Oran Mor in Glasgow.  Presented by BAFTA Scotland, the accolades honour the best upcoming talent in the field of film and television in Scotland. The Nominees were announced on 12 March 2012. The ceremony was hosted by Muriel Gray.

Winners and nominees

Winners are listed first and highlighted in boldface.

Special Award for New Work
How Can You Swallow So Much Sleep?

See also
2012 British Academy Scotland Awards

References

External links
BAFTA Scotland Home page

New Talent
British Academy Scotland
2012 in Scotland
2010s in Glasgow
2012 in British cinema 
2012 in British television
2012 television awards
BAFTA
March 2012 events in the United Kingdom